John Shepperd may refer to:
 Shepperd Strudwick, American actor, also billed as John Shepperd
 John Ben Shepperd, American lawyer, businessman, and politician
 John Shepperd (cricketer), English cricketer and umpire

See also
 John Shepherd (disambiguation)
 John Sheppard (disambiguation)